The geography of the Heard Island and McDonald Islands (HIMI) refers to the geography of Heard Island and the McDonald Islands, one of the most remote places on earth. These subantarctic islands were transferred to Australia by the United Kingdom in 1947. They lie between Madagascar and Antarctica.

HIMI has no ports or harbours; ships must anchor offshore. The HIMI marine zone, situated to the south of the Antarctic Convergence, is a biological hot spot for breeding and non-breeding seabirds and marine mammals such as penguins, petrels, elephant seals and fur seals. HIMI was inscribed as a UNESCO Heritage Site in 1999 under the title " "Territory of Heard Island and McDonald Islands".

McDonald Islands
The McDonald Islands, of volcanic origin, are ice free. The islands are small and rocky. In 1980, they consisted of McDonald Island ( high), Flat Island ( high) and Meyer Rock ( high). Like Heard Island, they were surface exposures of the Kerguelen Plateau.

McDonald Island
Topographic features are the northern sloping plateau and the southern steep-sided hill named the Maxwell Hill. Both features have steep cliffs and merge into a common isthmus. The island's volcano, after being dormant for 75,000 years, became active in 1992 and has erupted several times since then. The most recent eruption is thought to have been on 10 August 2005. Currently there is on-going regeneration of vegetation. Volcanic activity has generated basaltic lava and tuffaceous material with no soil cover.

Heard Island
Heard Island is by far the largest of the group. Its mountains are covered in glaciers; the island is 80% covered with ice. Mawson Peak is one of only two active volcanoes in the Australian territory, the other being on McDonald Island. It is also one of the highest Australian mountains, surpassed only by peaks in the Australian Antarctic Territory. Volcanic activity on the island has been noted since the mid-1980s, particularly on the southern part of the island which has resulted in the island's shape undergoing change and all wildlife disappearing; it is also reported that the size of the island has doubled and its height increased.

From Big Ben, rock buttresses of exposed rock descending in a radial pattern have been created due to erosion of the volcanic formations. Glaciers have carried the eroded sediment to the downstream end of the island and formed the low land of the Nullarbor (gravel isthmus) between the two volcanoes, and further to the east in the Elephant Spit. The end of this spit is called "Spit Point", and the bay to the north is named "Spit Bay". To the southwest of this spit on the southeast coast of the island is the Winston Lagoon. Cape Gazert, on the northwestern coast of the island, is just to the south of South West Bay, a bay which lies between Cape Gazert and the peninsula on the northwestern tip of Heard Island, the Laurens Peninsula. Immediately to the east of the peninsula along the northern coast is Atlas Cove, a small peninsula in turn separates it from Corinthian Bay, further to the east.

Islets and rocks

Glaciers

The glaciers fall under the Antarctic Environmental Gradient, which spans 30 degrees of latitude and includes a range of macro-climatic zones from cool temperate islands to the frigid and arid Antarctic continent. The glaciers can appear fast-flowing due to the steep slope and high precipitation, and are particularly sensitive to climatic fluctuations. Measurements between 1947 and 1980 show that glacial retreat, particularly on the eastern flanks, is correlated with changes in weather patterns.

A 29 percent reduction in area of the Brown Glacier from 1947 to 2003 was observed. The volcano Big Ben, from which all the glaciers drain, has shown no sign of changing geothermal output to cause the melting; a  warming has occurred over the same time period. Glaciologists continue to study the Brown Glacier, detailing surveys of the glacier's snout and surface, which determine if glacial retreat is rapid or punctuated. Measurements on the mass balance of the glacier, as well as more detailed ice thickness measurements using a portable radar echo sounder, were undertaken. Monitoring of climatic conditions continues, with emphasis on the impact of Foehn winds on glacier mass balance.

Repairs were made to an automatic weather station established in November 2000. An expedition by scientists from the Australian Antarctic Division visited the volcanic island in 2009, observing glaciers that had retreated  in three years. Glaciologist Dr. Ian Allison states that the latest aerial surveys, in 2009, showed continuous rapid melt.

Winston Lagoon
Winston Lagoon is a lagoon indenting the southeast coast of Heard Island in the southern Indian Ocean, about 1 nautical mile (1.9 km) northeast of Cape Lockyer. The feature is roughly portrayed on an American sealer chart of the 1860 period. It was sighted from the air by Lieutenant Malcolm Smith, RAAF, pilot of the ANARE (Australian National Antarctic Research Expeditions) seaplane that made the first reconnaissance flight over the island in 1948. Lieutenant Smith proposed that it be named Lake Winston after his wife. In view of his death in an aircraft accident shortly afterward, this proposal was adopted by Australian Antarctic Names and Medals Committee (ANCA) with only a change of generic term.

Climate 
The islands have an Antarctic climate, tempered by their maritime setting. The weather is marked by low seasonal and daily temperature ranges, persistent and generally low cloud cover, frequent precipitation and strong winds. Snowfall occurs throughout the year. The winds are predominantly westerly and persistently strong. Gusts in excess of  have been recorded. The Relative Humidity also remains high at more than 80% through most of the year and this condition coupled with mountainous terrain results in high cloud cover "and often-spectacular cloud formulations, such as cap, lenticular and rotor (collectively wave clouds) commonly observed over and downwind of Big Ben and to a lesser extent Laurens Peninsula."

Meteorological records at Heard Island are incomplete, but there is evidence that the local climate is changing. Observations at Atlas Cove indicate an increase in average annual air temperature of almost 1 °C between the periods 1948-1954 and 1997–2001. This is reported to have caused glacial retreat and as result lagoons and freshwater lakes are getting formed, and flora and fauna have emerged in the new land.

Geology
The geological formations recorded in HMII consists of deposits of limestone and volcanic origin (karst and volcanic features). The base rock formation in the Heart Island is marine geology formation of middle Eocene to early Oligocene limestones; the volcanic eruptions over lie these formations.

Conservation
HIMI are listed in the Register of the National Estate, since 1983, under the Australia Heritage Commission Act, 1975. It was inscribed on the UNESCO World Heritage List in 1997. The inscribed area is 658,903 ha (which includes both terrestrial and marine land) and under Criteria: (viii)and (ix) with the title "Territory of Heard Island and McDonald Islands" stating that it will "‘open a window into the earth’, thus providing the opportunity to observe ongoing geomorphic processes and glacial dynamics. The distinctive conservation value of Heard and McDonald – one of the world's rare pristine island ecosystems – lies in the complete absence of alien plants and animals, as well as human impact."

References

External links
Click here  to see a map of Heard Island and McDonald Islands, including all major topographical features.

Heard